Hawbridge is a village in Worcestershire, England.

References

Villages in Worcestershire